Ring Out Bow Bells! is a children's historical novel by Cynthia Harnett. It was first published in London in 1953, and in New York as The Drawbridge Gate in 1954. In 1984 a US edition was published under the title of The Sign of the Green Falcon. It is the story of a boy called Dickon who had wanted to be a Grocer Apprentice. According to the book, Dickon despised the Mercer Guild, especially after a fight with Kurt Bladebone, a feared and strong Mercer apprentice. Later, he "unfortunately" finds he will be a Mercer apprentice which was his most terrible fear. It turned out, for him, that being a mercer apprentice is more fun than he thought. It is based in the time of Henry V, when Dick Whittington had had his third time as Lord Mayor of London.

References

1953 British novels
1953 children's books
British children's novels
Children's historical novels
Novels set in London
Novels set in the 15th century
Cultural depictions of Henry V of England
Methuen Publishing books